Israel–Kazakhstan relations refers to the current and historical relations between Israel and Kazakhstan. The countries established diplomatic relations on April 10, 1992. The embassy of Israel in Astana, Kazakhstan opened in August 1992. The embassy of Kazakhstan in Tel Aviv, Israel opened in May 1996.

History
The Kazakhstan Secretary of State met with Moshe Kamkhy, Israel's ambassador to Uzbekistan in  August 2004 to discuss social and economic ties between the countries and moving the Israeli Embassy to Astana. 

The two countries maintain close contacts in the defense and intelligence sector. Ninety-five Kazakh farmers, managers, and scientists have trained in Israel.

In April 2009, Kazakhstan's National Security Committee claimed that the country's Ministry of Defense knowingly bought faulty artillery and defense systems from Israeli weapons manufacturers. Kazhimurat Mayermanov, a deputy defense minister, was arrested in connection with the case.

In June 2009, Israeli President Shimon Peres visited Kazakhstan, as he had a number of times as foreign minister.

Israeli Prime Minister Benjamin Netanyahu attended the Kazakh-Israeli business forum in Astana in December 2016. Netanyahu's visit to Kazakhstan was the first by an Israeli head of government.

Some Israeli commentators have signaled that Israel's relations with the Central Asian states, including Kazakhstan, are part of the country's involvement in "The Great Game" for control over the strategic natural resources in Central Asia. In a similar vein, the Islamic Republic of Iran both publicly fumed about and privately tried to cancel Kazakhstan's ties to Israel, to no avail; Iran had earlier tried and failed to have the newly independent former-USSR Muslim majority states ally with them instead of Saudi Arabia and the U.S. in the aftermath of the fall of the Soviet Union, and their anti-Israel moves have been fairly similar in both style and results.

Economic collaboration
Over 25% of Israel's oil purchases are from Kazakhstan, and Kazakhstan is seeking to increase oil sales to Israel.

Israel and Kazakhstan launched the Israel-Kazakhstan Irrigation Demonstration Center in the Almaty region.

Jewish community in Kazakhstan 

Kazakhstan's Jewish population surged dramatically when Stalin exiled thousands of Jews from the former Pale of Settlement. An additional 8,500 Jews escaped during the Second World War and fled to Kazakhstan. Since 1989, approximately 10,000 Kazakh Jews have relocated to Israel.

The Beit Rachel synagogue in Astana, opened in 2004, is the largest in Central Asia.

In 1999, all of Kazakhstan's Jewish communities were brought together under the All-Kazakhstan Jewish Congress. The country's first synagogue was opened in 2001 by Chabad Lubavitch, and a community center featuring a Jewish day school and summer camps, was also set up.

Today, Kazakhstan's Jewish community of 3,300 has more than 20 Jewish organizations and 14 day schools. Over 700 Jewish students attend 14 Jewish day schools across the country and The Jewish Agency for Israel also sponsors several youth centers across the country where Jewish teens are taught Jewish culture and Hebrew.

The Jewish community of Kazakhstan continues its cultural heritage. In 2007, a youth dance and vocal group Prahim was created in Almaty. The highlight of Prahim's repertoire is the popular Yiddish song, "Bei Mir Bistu Shein", which the band performs in four languages: Kazakh, Russian, Yiddish and Hebrew. In October 2014 the group performed several concerts in Boston and New York City. A reciprocal visit by American Jewish youth performers to Kazakhstan was planned for spring 2015.

In September 2016, the central synagogue in Almaty held the twelfth Torah scroll introduction ceremony. It was a tribute to Rabbi Levi Yitzchak Schneerson, the Lubavitch Rebbe's father, after which the Jewish centre of Kazakhstan, Chabad Lubavitch, was named.

Israeli Ambassadors to Kazakhstan  
  Ben-Zion Carmel (1993 - 1996)
  Israel Mei-Ami (1996 - 2002, 2008 - 2012)
  Moshe Kimkhi (2002 - 2004)
  Michael Lotem (2004 - 2006)
  Ran Yishai (2006 - 2008)
  Eliyahu Tasman (2012 - 2015)
  Michael Brodsky (6 September 2015 - 2018)
  Liat Vekselman (since 2018)

See also
 Foreign relations of Israel
 Foreign relations of Kazakhstan
 Jews in Kazakhstan
 List of ambassadors of Israel to Kazakhstan

References

External links
  Kazakh Ministry of Foreign Affairs about the relations with Israel 
  Kazakh embassy in Tel Aviv

 
Kazakhstan
Bilateral relations of Kazakhstan